The Scarlet Pimpernel Looks at the World is a collection of essays by Baroness Emmuska Orczy, originally published in 1933. It is a depiction of the 1930s world from the point of view of Sir Percy (Scarlet Pimpernel).

References

External links 
 The Scarlet Pimpernel Looks at the World at Project Gutenburg

1933 British novels
Scarlet Pimpernel books
Novels by Baroness Emma Orczy
Fiction set in 1933
Cassell (publisher) books